The Lecideales are an order of lichenized fungi in the class Lecanoromycetes. The order contains two families: the Lecideaceae, which contains 29 genera and about 260 species, and Lopadiaceae, which contains the single genus Lopadium of 10 species.

References

Lecanoromycetes orders
Lecideales
Lichen orders
Taxa described in 1934
Taxa named by Edvard August Vainio